Brut may refer to:

Literature
 Roman de Brut, a verse chronicle in Kirchheimer by Wace
 Layamon's Brut, an English chronicle by Layamon based on Wace
 Brut y Tywysogion (Chronicle of the Princes), a Welsh mediaeval chronicle
 Brut y Brenhinedd (Chronicle of the Kings), a Welsh mediaeval chronicle
 The Prose Brut, or Brut Chronicle, a chronicle of England in Anglo-Norman, Latin, and English, whose earliest versions date from the late 13th century

People
 Brutus of Troy, also known as Brut, in legends said to be the first king of Britain
 Walter Brut, a 14th-century writer from the Welsh borders

Other
 Brut (wine), a sweetness designation of a dry sparkling wine
 Brut (cologne), a classic masculine scent first made in 1964
 Art Brut, an English and German rock band
 Outsider art (art brut), art produced by non-professionals working outside aesthetic norms

See also
 Brute (disambiguation)